Otto Christian Ites (5 February 1918 – 2 February 1982) was a German naval officer, serving first as a submarine commander with the Kriegsmarine during World War II, and later as Konteradmiral with the Bundesmarine.

Career
Otto Ites, born on 5 February 1918 in Norden in the Province of Hanover a Free State of Prussia, joined the military service of the Kriegsmarine on 3 April 1936. From 3 April 1938 until 2 October 1939, he served on the torpedo boats Kondor and Albatros in the  4th and 6th Torpedo Boat Flotilla.

Promoted to Oberleutnant zur See on 1 October 1940 and he was made first watch officer on U-48. In this position he went on one more patrol (10 November 1940 – 13 March 1941), U-48 now again under the command of Schultze.

In September 1941 the Pegasus was torpedoed and all the crew managed to scramble into two lifeboats. One of the lifeboats was rescued but the other was found empty and upside down. The Captain reported that the Pegasus was torpedoed twice, the first one caused quite a lot of damage and the crew left the ship, but then she was torpedoed again and she sank. On 28 August 1942 U-94 was sunk by depth charges in the Caribbean Sea, in position  from a Catalina of VP-92 and by the Canadian corvette . Ites and 25 of his crew were taken prisoner of war. Ites remained in US captivity at Camp Crossville, Tennessee, until 1 May 1946.

After the war Otto Ites matriculated at the University of Bonn in the winter semester 1946/47. He submitted his dissertation on 20 October 1950 at the medical faculty. Ites joined the military service of the Bundesmarine and as Fregattenkapitän commanded the destroyer Zerstörer 2 (D171), formerly USS Ringgold (DD-500), from November 1960 until September 1962.

Awards
 Iron Cross (1939)
 2nd Class (27 October 1939)
 1st Class (25 February 1940)
 U-boat War Badge (1939) (21 December 1939)
 Knight's Cross of the Iron Cross on 28 March 1942 as Oberleutnant zur See and commander of U-94

References

Citations

Bibliography

External links
 
BBC

1918 births
1982 deaths
Bundesmarine admirals
U-boat commanders (Kriegsmarine)
Recipients of the Knight's Cross of the Iron Cross
University of Bonn alumni
Counter admirals of the German Navy
Commanders Crosses of the Order of Merit of the Federal Republic of Germany
Military personnel from Lower Saxony
People from Norden, Lower Saxony